The 2000 Paris Sevens was an international rugby sevens tournament that was part of the World Sevens Series in the inaugural 1999–2000 season. It was the France Sevens leg of the series, held on 27–28 May 2000, at Stade Sébastien Charléty in Paris.

Ahead of the tournament, which was the tenth and final event of the series, Fiji lead the standings by six points over New Zealand. However, following Fiji's 35–21 defeat by Argentina in the Cup quarterfinals, New Zealand became the inaugural World Sevens Series champions as they defeated South Africa 69–10 in the Cup final.

Format
The teams were drawn into four pools of four teams each. Each team played the other teams in their pool once, with 3 points awarded for a win, 2 points for a draw, and 1 point for a loss (no points awarded for a forfeit). The pool stage was played on the first day of the tournament. The top two teams from each pool advanced to the Cup/Plate brackets. The bottom two teams from each pool went on to the Bowl bracket. No Shield trophy was on offer in the 1999-2000 season.

Teams
The 16 participating teams for the tournament:

 
 
 
 
 
 
  French Barbarians

Pool stage
The pool stage was played on the first day of the tournament. The 16 teams were separated into four pools of four teams and teams in the same pool played each other once. The top two teams in each pool advanced to the Cup quarterfinals to compete for the 2000 Fiji Sevens title.

Pool A

Source: World Rugby

Source: World Rugby

Pool B

Source: World Rugby

Source: World Rugby

Pool C

Source: World Rugby

Source: World Rugby

Pool D

Source: World Rugby

Source: World Rugby

Knockout stage

Bowl

Source: World Rugby

Plate

Source: World Rugby

Cup

Source: World Rugby

Tournament placings

Source: Rugby7.com

Series standings
At the completion of Round 10:

Source: Rugby7.com

 South Africa reached the semifinal stage of the Brisbane Sevens but was stripped of all points for the tournament due to fielding ineligible players.

References

1999–2000 IRB Sevens World Series
1999–2000 in French rugby union
France Sevens